Wentworth is a small border town in the far south west of the state of New South Wales, Australia. It lies at the confluence of Australia's two most important rivers, the Darling and the Murray, the latter forming the border with the state of Victoria to the south. The town of Wentworth is in the local government area of the same name.

History

Moorna Post Office opened on 22 February 1855 and was renamed Wentworth in 1860.

In 1876, Wentworth township was described in the following terms:
Wentworth is situated on the Darling, about half a mile from the junction, and is plainly visible from the Murray.  The township is built on rising ground, and, save in very exceptional seasons, is quite out of reach of flood waters.  The population is between 400 and 500.  The place appears prosperous and progressive.  The trade up the Darling River, and the supply of stores to the stations in the vicinity, form the life-blood of its prosperity.  Wentworth possesses a custom-house – a hideous little building resembling a watch-house, and as great an eyesore as the cause of its establishment is an inconvenience and annoyance to trade.  The other public buildings are a post and telegraph office, for Wentworth is on the main telegraph line to Adelaide, and a court-house and offices, which are also used for land offices.  There is a resident police magistrate, Mr. Richardson ... The two churches in Wentworth are buildings creditable to the town.  The Roman Catholic Church is a brick structure, the Protestant Church an edifice of brick and stone... There are three or four stores of considerable size, and several hotels.  The Australian Joint Stock Bank has a branch here.  The river, which, opposite the town is about the width of the Murray at Echuca, is crossed by a punt.

Heritage listings
Wentworth has a number of heritage-listed sites, including:
 112 Beverley Street: Wentworth Gaol
 30 Cadell Street: Saint Ignatius School, Wentworth
 Darling Street: St John's Anglican Church, Wentworth
 1122a Low Darling Road: Avoca Homestead Complex

Railways

During the late 1800s Wentworth was an important river port; however, like many such towns, its significance faded with the development of the railways (railroads).

In 1902, the people of Wentworth were lobbying for a railway from Mildura to be built, including a bridge over the River Murray.

Floods

The town has been flooded many times by the two rivers. The most significant was in 1956, when both rivers flooded simultaneously. Local farmers, supplemented by the army and navy, worked for months to build levee banks to hold the water out of the town.

Visitor attractions
Wentworth is now an important tourist outback destination and provides a welcome break for those travelling to or from Broken Hill. In addition to its authentic outback charm, the town offers some interesting attractions:

 PS Ruby – a restored 1907 side-wheel paddlesteamer
The 5 yearly Great Wentworth Tractor Rally
The Wentworth Gaol
The Perry Sandhills

The Great Wentworth Tractor Rally is a commemoration of the grey Fergie tractors that were used to maintain the levee banks and save the town from the 1956 Murray River flood.

Wentworth was a popular destination for 'pokie tour' bus rides from Adelaide, the capital city of South Australia, prior to the legalisation of poker (gambling) machines in that state.

Sport
The town has an Australian rules football team competing in the Sunraysia Football League.

And the Wentworth District Rowing Club has  regular regattas and attendance at national and international events. http://www.sunraysiadaily.com.au/story/4598820/gold-edge-to-regatta/

Notable people
Leal Douglas, actress, lived in Wentworth in the 1930s.
Jarrod Brander, Australian rules footballer

Climate
Wentworth has a Semi-arid climate (BSh) with hot summers and mild winters. Historical maxima and minima are 48.1 °C and −2.8 °C, respectively.

Gallery

References

External links

Wentworth Shire Council
The Great Wentworth Tractor Rally
Paddlesteamer Ruby

 
1860 establishments in Australia
Populated places established in 1860
Towns in New South Wales
Populated places on the Murray River
Populated places on the Darling River
River ports of Australia
Far West (New South Wales)